The 2013–14 Fordham Rams women's basketball team represents Fordham University during the 2013–14 NCAA Division I women's basketball season. The team was coached by Stephanie Gaitley in her third year at the school. Fordham Rams home games were played at Rose Hill Gymnasium and the team is a member of the Atlantic 10 Conference. The Rams finished with an 11-5 record in conference play and were the 3-seed going into the A-10 Tournament. The Rams emerged as conference tournament champions to earn the automatic bid to the NCAA tournament.

Roster

Schedule and results

|-
!colspan=9 style="background:#76032E; color:#FFFFFF;"|Exhibition

|-
!colspan=9 style="background:#76032E; color:#FFFFFF;"|Regular Season

|-
!colspan=9 style="background:#76032E; color:#FFFFFF;"|2014 A10 Tournament

|-
!colspan=9 style="background:#76032E; color:#FFFFFF;"|2014 NCAA Tournament

References

Fordham
Fordham Rams women's basketball seasons